Wednesday 3:30 PM is a South Korean mini television series starring Lee Hong-bin, Jin Ki-joo, Ahn Bo-hyun and Cha Jung-won. The drama first aired on Oksusu, a mobile app, on May 31, 2017. It first aired on Oksusu, then aired on SBS Plus every Wednesday at 15:30 (KST) starting from June 7, 2017.

Synopsis 
Story about a girl called Sun Eun-woo (Jin Ki-joo) who was dumped by her boyfriend and tries win him back by making him jealous. She manipulates her social media to create a fake "lovestagram" (love + Instagram) with her childhood friend Yoon Jae-won (Lee Hong-bin).

Cast

Main 
 Lee Hong-bin as Yoon Jae-won
 Jin Ki-joo as Sun Eun-woo
 Ahn Bo-hyun as Baek Seung-kyu
 Cha Jung-won as Gong Na-yeon

Others 
 Kim Hye-ji as Kim Hye-won
 Lim Too-cheol as Yang Tae-kyung
 Jo Seung-hee as Choi Sun-ah
 Ha-eun as Ha-eun
 Yang Jung-yoon as Ji-yul
 Song Da-eun as Da-eun
Baek Bo-ram as Seung-kyu's new girlfriend

Production 
The first script reading took place in March 2017.

Original soundtracks

Tracks

References

External links 
  (in Korean)

Seoul Broadcasting System television dramas
South Korean romantic comedy television series
2017 South Korean television series debuts
Korean-language television shows
2017 South Korean television series endings